Qaratəpə or Qaratepe (Azeribaijani for "Black Hill") may refer to:

Azerbaijan
 Qaratəpə, Barda, Azerbaijan
 Qaratəpə, Sabirabad, Azerbaijan

Iran
 Qaratepe, Mazandaran, Iran
 Qaratepe, Zanjan, Iran
 Qaratepe, Abhar, Zanjan Province, Iran
 Qaratepe, Qareh Poshtelu, Zanjan County, Zanjan Province, Iran